Labonte Motorsports is a former part-time Winston Cup team and full-time Busch Series team. It was owned by the Labonte racing family from Corpus Christi, Texas and competed for several years under various incarnations.

1980s 
Labonte Motorsports debuted in 1982 at Martinsville Speedway in the No. 44 Oldsmobile, when it was owned Bob Labonte. Bobby Labonte drove the car, starting fifteenth and finishing twenty-sixth after dropping out 30 laps into the race. They did not run a race until 1985, when Bobby drove two races in the No. 81 at Martinsville, his best finish being seventeenth in the fall race. In 1986, Terry Labonte drove two races, winning the pole at Road Atlanta and finished second at the same race. Bobby returned to run six races in the No. 88 Winner's Circle Auto Parts Buick, but wrecked out of three of them. In 1989, he switched back to the No. 44 and had first three top-tens, including a fourth-place finish at Rockingham Speedway.

1990s 
Labonte ran his first full season 1990, with sponsorship from Penrose Firecracker. Although he went winless, he had seventeen top-tens and finished fourth in the final standings. In 1991, he won two races and the Busch Series championship. That same season, Labonte Motorsports, ran five races at the Winston Cup level. Bobby ran two races for Bob, first in the 14, and then the 44, dropping out of both races with engine failure. Irv Hoerr then ran three races for Terry in the 44, his best finish being 19th at Pocono Raceway. Terry also began fielding his own entries in Busch, driving five races in the No. 94 Sunoco Oldsmobile and picking up a win at Watkins Glen International. In 1992, Labonte won three races but lost the championship by three points. Terry failed to win a race, but switched to the No. 14 after picking up sponsorship from MW Windows.

Bobby moved up to Cup in 1993, and was replaced by Labonte Motorsports mechanic David Green with Slim Jim becoming the team's new sponsor. Although he failed to win in his first season with the team, he had six top-fives and finished third in points. The No. 14 was shared by Bobby and Terry, who together won two pole positions. In 1994, Green won one race but also claimed the Busch Series championship. Terry had four wins out of twenty starts, and Bobby debuted the new No. 33 Dentyne Pontiac, winning at Michigan International Speedway. Green had another win in 1995, but fell to twelfth in the standings. Terry had one win and finished eighteenth in points.

In 1996, Bob retired from racing and Bobby became the new listed owner of the 44. With Shell Oil sponsoring, Bobby ran sixteen races and won at Nashville Speedway USA. Terry changed his number to 5 and picked up funding from Bayer/Actron, and won three races that season. Bobby Hamilton ran the season finale at Homestead, finishing 24th. He drove fourteen times in 1997, but failed to win a race. Andy Hillenburg and Brad Leighton drove in one-race deals for him, but they failed to finish in the top-ten. Bobby drove fifteen times in 1998, and had another win, along with sharing the ride with Tony Stewart for five races, who had two top-tens.
At the end of the season, Bobby sold his team to this employer, Joe Gibbs Racing.

2000s 
After taking 1998 off, Labonte Motorsports returned in 1999, with Terry owning and driving the No. 44 Slim Jim Chevrolet. He won his final career Busch race at Talladega Superspeedway, and had three top-fives. Jack Sprague and Steve Grissom drove one race deals for him, and Terry's son Justin began racing, making nine starts that season with a best finish of fourteenth at Myrtle Beach Speedway. Labonte and Glenn Allen Jr. shared the ride to begin the 2000 season, before Justin finished it out. His best finish was 20th at Nashville.

Labonte Motorsports was inactive until Justin began running a part-time schedule in 2004. Driving the No. 44 United States Coast Guard Dodge Intrepid, he made sixteen starts and won the Twister 300 at Chicagoland Speedway. The team partnered with Haas CNC Racing in 2005 to allow Justin to run a full-time schedule in the 44 Chevy. Despite three top-tens and a seventeenth-place finish in points, Coast Guard departed for Richard Childress Racing at the end of the season, causing the team to close its doors again.

External links 
Bob Labonte Owner Stats
Bobby Labonte Owner Stats
Terry Labonte owner stats
Justin Labonte owner stats

Auto racing teams established in 1982
Sports clubs disestablished in 2006
American auto racing teams
Companies based in North Carolina
Defunct NASCAR teams
ARCA Menards Series teams
Defunct companies based in North Carolina
1982 establishments in North Carolina